The Women's Boat Race is an annual rowing race between Cambridge University Women's Boat Club and Oxford University Women's Boat Club. First rowed in 1927, the race has taken place annually since 1964. Since the 2015 race it has been rowed on the same day and course as the men's Boat Race on the River Thames in London, taking place around Easter, and since 2018 the name "The Boat Race" has been applied to the combined event. The race is rowed in eights and the cox can be of any gender.

The course covers a  stretch of the Thames in West London, from Putney to Mortlake. Members of both crews are traditionally known as blues and each boat as a "Blue Boat", with Cambridge in light blue and Oxford dark blue. As of 2021 Cambridge have won the race 45 times and Oxford 30 times. Cambridge has led Oxford in cumulative wins since 1966.  The women's race has received television coverage and grown in popularity since 2015, attracting a television audience of 4.8 million viewers that year. The 2019 race was won by Cambridge by five lengths.

History

Early years
The first women's rowing event between Oxford and Cambridge was held on 15 March 1927 on The Isis in Oxford. This was not solely a race in the years up to 1935, the two boats were not on the river together and were judged on both their speed and their "steadiness, finish, rhythm and other matters of style". The Times reported that "large and hostile crowds gathered on the towpath" and The New York Times stated "a crowd of fully five thousand persons was on hand as a willing cheering section". Reports differ as to the judges' opinions on style: one suggests they failed to agree on a winner, another indicates that they deemed the style of each crew to be equal. As a result, the judges based their decision on speed: the race was won by Oxford in a time of 3 minutes 36 seconds, beating Cambridge by 15 seconds.

The next event in 1929 took place on the Tideway in London. At the 1935 race, after two intervening events, the crews took to the river together for the first time. Racing on the Thames in London Oxford's boat was sent off first with the Cambridge boat following thirty seconds later. The 1936 race, held on The Isis, was the first to take place side by side. Later, the location alternated between the River Cam in Cambridge and The Isis, over a distance of about 1,000 yards. Unlike the men's race, the women's continued in most years through the Second World War.

The Cambridge University Women's Boat Club was founded in 1941 when Girton College became the second women's college to cater for rowing. Until that year Cambridge was represented by Newnham College Boat Club. The first blues were awarded in 1941 when CUWBC raced against Oxford University Women's Boat Club, which had been founded in 1926. All of the Cambridge rowers in 1941 were members of Newnham College. The following year the first non-Newnham rower competed.

In training after the 1952 race, Oxford rowed over a weir and was banned from the river. Both OUWBC and later CUWBC suffered from lack of funds and the race fell into abeyance. After a 12-year gap, the race restarted in 1964 and has been held annually since. The number of women rowers increased as more colleges started to admit women and reserve boats from each university began racing in 1966, the year after the men's reserve boats began racing. A second reserve race was run in 1968, and the reserves have raced annually since 1975. The women's reserve boats were later named Osiris (Oxford) and Blondie (Cambridge).

Henley Boat Races

In 1975 the men's lightweight race started at Henley-on-Thames and the women's Boat race was relocated there in 1977 creating the Henley Boat Races. At Henley the race took place over a distance of 2,000 metres.

The First VIII receive university blues, and is therefore more commonly known as the Blue Boat, with Cambridge in light blue and Oxford dark blue. While the crew is all female, the cox can be male or female. The Second VIII receives university colours. The 2011 race was the first to be sponsored by Newton Investment Management, a subsidiary of BNY Mellon. Previously the crews had no sponsorship and were self funded. Newton have remained the sponsor since then and increased the amount of funding significantly.

For the 2013 race the entire Henley Boat Races was moved to Dorney Lake because of flooding on the river, and they had also been moved in 2001, to the Holme Pierrepont National Watersports Centre in Nottingham. Oxford won the 2014 race on the Henley course having beaten Cambridge by a distance of four boat lengths over two kilometres. A newly designed trophy, to replace the existing wooden shield, was awarded to the Oxford president by Olympic gold medallist Sophie Hosking who had won the Women's lightweight double sculls at the 2012 Summer Olympics.

The Boat Races

On 11 April 2015 the 70th women's race was held on The Championship Course on the same day as the traditional male event for the first time. The course covers a  stretch of the Thames in West London, from Putney to Mortlake. Rebranded as "The Boat Races", the combined event was broadcast on national television in UK, during which the audience for the women's race reached 4.8 million viewers. OUWBC won by six and half lengths that year. The Reserves race also moved to the Championship Course in 2015, running on the day prior to the main race. In 2016 all four men's and women's boat races took place on the same day and course for the first time. Cancer Research UK were gifted the title sponsorship rights by BNY Mellon and Newton Investment Management, an arrangement which continued for the following two years. The 2016 race, again receiving national television coverage, was won by Oxford while the Cambridge boat nearly sank in the rough conditions.

The 2017 race took place on Sunday 2 April at 16:35 British Summer Time, an hour before the men's race. Cambridge won for the first time in five years after Oxford caught a crab at the start. They set a record on the new course, beating the time first set on this course in 2015 by over a minute. The time was faster, in different conditions, than the Cambridge men's Blue Boat in 2016 and the Oxford men's in 2014. Beginning with the 2018 race, the combined event was branded simply as "The Boat Race", consisting of "The Women's Boat Race" and "The Men's Boat Race". The 2019 race was Cambridge's third consecutive victory and the fourth consecutive victory for their reserve boat, Blondie.

The race has been won 45 times by Cambridge and 30 times by Oxford, with Cambridge leading Oxford in cumulative wins since 1966. The reserves race has been won 28 times by Cambridge and 20 times by Oxford, with Cambridge leading in cumulative wins since the inception of the race.

Results

Women's Boat Race
 Cambridge: 45 wins
 Oxford: 30 wins

Notes

 – The events until 1935 were not run solely as races, but were also judged on style merit marks. The crews were not allowed to be on the river at the same time so each eight rowed separately downstream and were judged on style. They then rowed back upstream to record a time.
 – The course was shortened in 2007 due to rough water during the Henley Boat Races.

Women's Reserves (Osiris vs Blondie)

 Cambridge: 28 wins
 Oxford: 20 wins

Sources:

See also 
 Oxford–Cambridge rivalry
 Varsity match

References

External links 

 
 The Boat Race course visualization on Google Earth/Maps 
 History of the women's event video narrated by Sir Matthew Pinsent The Telegraph
 The story of the women's race BBC Sport video
 1927 race footage British Pathé

 
1927 establishments in England
Recurring sporting events established in 1927
Annual events in London
Rowing on the River Thames
Putney